The HP C/aC++ Developer's Bundle includes the utilities for creating C and C++ programs. These tools provide features such as performance analysis, code analysis, and the HP-UX Developer's Toolkit. This product runs on HP-UX 11i v3, on the HPE Integrity Servers and HP 9000 systems.

Products
The HP C/aC++ Developer's Bundle includes:
 HP C/ANSI C compiler
 HP aC++ compiler
 HP-UX Developer's Toolkit
 HP WDB debugger
 HP Caliper performance analyzer
 HP Code Advisor (cadvise) analysis tool

External links
 HP aC++
 HP Caliper performance analyzer
 HP Code Advisor (cadvise)

C++ compilers
C (programming language) compilers